Within human psychology, the Jenkins Activity Survey (JAS) is one of the most widely used methods of assessing Type A behavior. The Jenkins Activity Survey is a psychometric survey of behavior and attitude designed to identify persons showing signs of Type A behavior. The test is multiple choice and self-administered.  It was published in 1979 by C. David Jenkins, Stephen Zyzanski, and Ray Rosenman. The terms Type A and Type B personality were originally described in the work of Rosenman and Friedman in 1959. The Jenkins Activity Survey was developed in an attempt to duplicate the clinical assessment of the Type A behavior pattern by employing an objective psychometric procedure. Individuals displaying a Type A behavior pattern are characterized by extremes of competitiveness, striving for achievement and personal recognition, aggressiveness, haste, impatience, explosiveness and loudness in speech, characteristics which the Jenkins Activity Survey attempts to measure. A popular sub-form of the Jenkins Activity Survey is form T, created to analyze Type A and Type B behavior in students as opposed to the original survey created with questions pertaining to the workforce.

JAS-T 
Form T of the Jenkins activity survey is a subform of the original Jenkins activity survey that utilizes the same methods and procedures as the Jenkins activity survey Form B, the adult version, but with questions altered to relate to student life as opposed to questions relating to occupational work (Bishop, 1989). This form was created in 1974 by Krantz, Glass, and Snyder to distinguish between Type A and Type B students and the differences among them relating to their school performance as well as gender differences and countless others. This form has been used in research not only to find information from students (Rainey, 1985) but also to test the reliability of Form T and subsequently the Jenkins Activity Survey as a whole (Bishop, 1989). Testing the reliability of this form is fundamental because although the changes made from the original survey were minor they could still have large effects in the overall scores and findings of the research. Research conducted by Bishop, Hailey, and O’Rourke in 1989 built off of previous research through using scores of those that were not found to be strongly Type A or Type B. In these cases, individuals who scored one standard deviation above the mean were classified as Type A and those one standard deviation below Type B. In this research, that utilized a test-retest approach, they were able to find reliable and statistically significant correlations between the first test and subsequent tests administered at the beginning of each of four semesters. These findings conclude the reliability of the test and add to other findings of the reliability of the overall Jenkins activity survey.

See also 

 Personality test
 Psychometrics

References

Psychological tests and scales